Civil rights in the United States include noted legislation and organized efforts to abolish public and private acts of racial discrimination against Native Americans, African Americans, Asians, Latin Americans, women, the homeless, minority religions, and other groups since the independence of the country.

Background 

Many events took place between 1776 and 1866. Some of them include:

Slavery in the United States (1776–1866) 

The institution of slavery in the United States existed since the colonial era when the Atlantic slave trade led to the importation of roughly 450,000 enslaved Africans to various European colonies in North America. After the United States was founded in 1776, slavery continued to exist on a widespread scale in the American South. Since the colonial era, an abolitionist movement existed to oppose American slavery, culminating in the abolition of enslavement in the U.S. during the Civil War.

Racial segregation in the United States

Racial segregation follows two forms;
 De jure segregation mandated the separation of races by law. Slave codes imposed them before the Civil War and by Black Codes and Jim Crow laws following the war.
 De facto segregation, or segregation "in fact", exists without the sanction of the law.

Frederick Douglass and James N. Buffum

In 1841 Frederick Douglass and his friend James N. Buffum entered a train car reserved for white passengers in Lynn, Massachusetts. When the conductor ordered them to leave the car, they refused. Following the action, widespread organizing led Congress to approve the Civil Rights Act of 1875, which granted equal rights to Black citizens in public accommodations. In 1883 the Supreme Court overturned this victory, declaring it unconstitutional in the Civil Rights Cases of 1883.

Elizabeth Jennings Graham

On July 16, 1854, Elizabeth Jennings Graham, a 24-year-old schoolteacher, opted to board a bus without the "Colored Persons Allowed" sign, and the conductor used force to expel her.

Charlotte L. Brown

In 1863, San Francisco's horse-powered streetcar companies only accepted white passengers. On April 17, 1863, Charlotte L. Brown, an African American citizen began to challenge this discrimination directly and boarded a streetcar of the Omnibus Railroad Company. She was forced off and she tried to do it two more times, but the outcome was the same. Each time she legally sued the company.

Demand for women's suffrage in the United States

The demand for women's suffrage began to gather strength in the 1840s, emerging from the broader movement for women's rights. In 1848, the Seneca Falls Convention, the first women's rights convention, passed a resolution in favor of women's suffrage despite opposition from some of its organizers, who believed the idea was too extreme.  By the time of the first National Women's Rights Convention in 1850, however, suffrage was becoming an increasingly important aspect of the movement's activities.

Movement for civil rights (1865–1896)

The civil rights movement (1865–1896) aimed to eliminate racial discrimination against African Americans, improve their educational and employment opportunities, and establish their electoral power just after the abolition of slavery in the United States. The period from 1865 to 1895 saw tremendous change in the fortunes of the Black community following the elimination of slavery in the South.

End of slavery in the United States of America

The Emancipation Proclamation was an executive order issued by President Abraham Lincoln on January 1, 1863. In a single stroke, it changed the legal status, as recognized by the U.S. government, of three million enslaved people in designated areas of the Confederacy from "slave" to "free". It had the practical effect that as soon as an enslaved person escaped the control of the Confederate government by running away or through advances of the federal Union Army, the enslaved person became legally and, in effect, free. Plantation owners, realizing that emancipation would destroy their economic system, sometimes moved the people they enslaved as far as possible out of reach of the Union army. By June 1865, the Union Army controlled all of the Confederacy and liberated all designated enslaved people.

Civil Rights Act of 1866

The Civil Rights Act of 1866 was the first United States federal law to define citizenship and affirm that all citizens are equally protected by the law. In the wake of the American Civil War, the Act was mainly intended to protect the civil rights of persons of African descent born in or brought to the United States.

The Act was passed by Congress in 1865 and vetoed by United States President Andrew Johnson. In April 1866, Congress again passed the bill to support the Thirteenth Amendment, and Johnson again vetoed it, but a two-thirds majority in each chamber overrode the veto to allow it to become law without a presidential signature. John Bingham and other congressmen argued that Congress did not yet have sufficient constitutional power to enact this law.  Following the passage of the Fourteenth Amendment in 1868, Congress ratified the 1866 Act in 1870. In 1871 they passed the US Civil Rights Act of 1871, also known as the Klan Act. In 1875 the Civil Rights Act of 1875 became law.

Katherine "Kate" Brown

Katherine Brown boarded a train in Alexandria, Virginia, when traveling towards Washington, D.C., on February 8, 1868. Brown entered "what they call the white people's car." As she was boarding, a railroad policeman told her to move to a different car. She replied, "This car will do." He told her the car she had entered "was for ladies," and "no damned nigger was allowed to ride in that car anyhow; never was and never would be." The railroad police officer and another employee grabbed Brown and, after a violent struggle that lasted six minutes, in which she was beaten and kicked, threw her on the boarding platform, dragged her along the platform, and threatened to arrest her. She asked, "What are you going to arrest me for? What have I done? Have I committed robbery? Have I murdered anybody?" Brown's injuries were so severe that she was bedridden for several weeks and spit up blood from hemorrhages in her lungs. {{cite court |litigants= Railroad Company v. Brown (1873)' |vol= |reporter= U.S. Senate|opinion= |pinpoint= |court= |date= June 17, 1868|url= https://www.senate.gov/artandhistory/history/resources/pdf/KateBrownReport.pdf|access-date= November 4, 2022|quote= |postscript= }}

Senators Charles Sumner and Justin Morrill called for a formal investigation, and Senator Charles Drake agreed. A resolution was passed on February 10, and a Senate committee heard testimony later that month. Brown sued the railway company for damages and was awarded $1,500 in damages in the district court. The railway company appealed, and the case eventually went before the US Supreme Court. On November 17, 1873, in an opinion delivered by Justice David Davis, the Court held that racial segregation on the railroad line was not allowed under its Congressional charter, which stated "no person shall be excluded from the cars on account of race." Davis dismissed the company's "separate but equal" argument as "an ingenious attempt to evade a compliance with the obvious meaning of the requirement" of the 1863 charter and decided in favor of Brown.

The Court held that white and Black passengers must be treated with equality in the use of the railroad's cars:

Movement for civil rights from 1896 to 1954

The civil rights movement (1896–1954) was a long, primarily nonviolent series of events to bring full civil rights and equality under the law to all Americans. The era has had a lasting impact on American society – in its tactics, the increased social and legal acceptance of civil rights, and its exposure of the prevalence and cost of racism.

Women's suffrage in the United States

Women's legal right to vote was established in the United States over the course of more than half a century, first in various states and localities, sometimes on a limited basis, and then nationally in the Nineteenth Amendment of 1920.

 Universal Declaration of Human Rights (1948) 

The Universal Declaration of Human Rights (UDHR) is an international document adopted by the United Nations General Assembly that enshrines the rights and freedoms of all human beings. It was accepted by the General Assembly as Resolution 217 during its third session on 10 December 1948 at the Palais de Chaillot in Paris, France.

A foundational text in the history of human and civil rights, the Declaration consists of 30 articles detailing an individual's "basic rights and fundamental freedoms" and affirming their universal character as inherent, inalienable, and applicable to all human beings. Adopted as a "common standard of achievement for all peoples and all nations", the UDHR commits nations to recognize all humans as being "born free and equal in dignity and rights" regardless of "nationality, place of residence, gender, national or ethnic origin, colour, religion, language, or any other status".

The Declaration is considered a "milestone document" for its "universalist language", which makes no reference to a particular culture, political system, or religion. It directly inspired the development of international human rights law and was the first step in the formulation of the International Bill of Human Rights, which was completed in 1966 and came into force in 1976. The United States of America has ratified the nine binding treaties influenced by the Declaration.

Civil rights movement 1954–1968

The 1954–1968 civil rights movement in the United States was preceded by a decades-long campaign by African Americans and their like-minded allies to end legalized racial discrimination, disenfranchisement, and racial segregation in the United States. The movement has origins in the Reconstruction era during the late 19th century, although it made its largest legislative gains in the 1960s after years of direct actions and grassroots protests. The social movement's major nonviolent resistance and civil disobedience campaigns eventually secured new protections in federal law for the human rights of all Americans.

End of racial segregation in the United States

De jure segregation was outlawed by the Civil Rights Act of 1964, the Voting Rights Act of 1965, and the Fair Housing Act of 1968. In specific areas, however, segregation was barred earlier by the Warren Court in decisions such as the Brown v. Board of Education decision that overturned school segregation in the United States.

Civil rights in the 21st centuryDe facto segregation continues today in areas such as residential segregation and school segregation because of both contemporary behavior and the historical legacy of de jure segregation.

Eradication of homelessness has also been a major problem in the United States. In 2010, 1,593,150 individuals experienced homelessness. The COVID-19 pandemic forced state governments to mandate lockdowns and thousands of companies to close business temporarily or permanently. This left them without resources to pay the salary of their employees, in some cases forcing them to close business permanently and being evicted. Millions of Americans lost their jobs and were unable to pay the rent, 7 million faced eviction in October 2021.

Various laws have both, directly and indirectly, criminalized people that are homeless and people attempting to feed homeless people outdoors. At least 31 cities have criminalized feeding people that are homeless.Richard Luscombe (November 5, 2014). 90-year-old among Florida activists arrested for feeding the homeless. The Guardian. Retrieved November 9, 2014.

See also
 Timeline of the civil rights movement 1954 to 1968
 Civil right acts in the United States
 Civil rights movements (worldwide)
 Destination Freedom'' – a 1948–1950 radio anthology focusing on civil rights vignettes
 Native American Indian Movement
 Transport and bus boycotts in the United States
 Universal Declaration of Human Rights

Notes

References

History of civil rights in the United States
civil rights movement
Movements for civil rights